Richard Hurst (fl. 1406) was an English politician.

He was a Member (MP) of the Parliament of England for Melcombe Regis in 1406.

References

14th-century births
15th-century deaths
English MPs 1406
Members of the Parliament of England (pre-1707) for Melcombe Regis